The 1897–98 Bucknell Bison men's basketball team represented Bucknell University during the 1897–98 college men's basketball season. The team had finished with an overall record of 4–4.

Schedule

|-

References

Bucknell Bison men's basketball seasons
Bucknell
Bucknell
Bucknell